Pouteria peruviensis is a species of plant in the family Sapotaceae. It is endemic to Peru.

References

peruviensis
Endemic flora of Peru
Vulnerable flora of South America
Taxonomy articles created by Polbot
Taxa named by André Aubréville